Jaime Franklin (born December 27, 1975) is a figure competitor from the United States.

Biography
Franklin was born in Glen Dale, and grew up in Cameron, a small town in West Virginia. There on a small farm Franklin spent her days helping her family with the duties of the house. While growing up Franklin became a very active young woman; her parents were very active themselves and made sure her daughter would follow through their footsteps. From the beginning Jaime was surrounded in an athletic environment; her parents put her on gymnastics in order for her to use all her natural childhood energy in something productive. And while she enjoyed gymnastics and competing in the field, most of her competitiveness came from practicing wrestling moves with her brother, Eric, who on two occasions broke her arm. But this did not discourage Jaime, who continued to practice wrestling moves with her brother and soon learned to defend herself.

As Franklin became older she became more serious about competing in gymnastics, but due to multiple injuries she was unable to compete and at the age of thirteen began to focus on started playing school sports. In school her best sport was track and field where in high school she set several records, including two Ohio Valley Athletic Conference track records for high hurdles and long jumps that are still standing to this day. Her athletic abilities helped Franklin earn an athletic scholarship to go to the Naval Academy in Maryland. After attending Naval Academy for three months, she left to West Virginia University in Morgantown where she majored in industrial and management systems and graduated summa cum laude.

A few years after graduation Franklin was in demand, she was traveling five days a week, working as a computer consultant and giving gymnastic lessons on the weekends. During a gymnastic session she tore her ACL and had to lay off traveling. With little to do she spent her time weight training in the gym. Soon many people were complimenting her physique and encouraged her to compete. Jaime decided to give it a world after seeing her first fitness contest. Originally she was training to compete in fitness, but due to her injury decided to go to figure competitions. Her first competition was NPC Natural Northern Figure Competition where she took the overall. She continued to compete and within four months earned her pro card.

Franklin continued to compete regularly until recently she pulled from competing in 2005 due to problems with old injuries from her gymnastic days: two herniated disks in her neck, bursitis, tendinitis kept from competing in the Arnold Classic and limited her training regimen. More recently returned to computer consulting, gave birth to her first child, and continues to train in her home outside of Columbus in Pickerington, Ohio with her husband Ted.

Vital Stats
Full Name: Jaime Franklin
Birthday: December 27
Place of Birth: Glen Dale, West Virginia
Current state of Residence: Pickerington, Ohio
Occupation: Figure competitor, personal trainer, and fitness model, computer consultant, gymnastics teacher
Marital Status: Married, Ted
Height: 5'3"
Weight (In Season): 120-123 lbs. (Off-Season):132-135 lbs.
Eye Color: Brown
Hair Color: Blonde
Measurements: 36-26-36
Size: 4/5
Shoe: 7.5

Bodybuilding philosophy
Franklin's training consists of simple compound movements with mostly free weights (she rarely uses cable exercises); she also rarely uses machines. She typically trains 5 days a week in the off-season (usually two body parts per day off-season, and only one body part per day on-season). She performs cardio 5–6 days a week for 30–60 minutes. Precontest, she will increase her cardio to 2 daily sessions 6 days a week.

Contest history
2002 NPC Natural Northern Figure Championships-1st (Short) and Overall
2002 NPC Mike Francois Figure Classic-2nd  (Short)
2002 NPC Cincinnati Figure Championships-2nd  (Short)
2002 NPC Natural Ohio Drug Tested Figure Championships-1st (short) and OVERALL
2002 NPC National Figure Championships-3rd (Medium), (IFBB Pro Qualifier)
2003 IFBB Arnold Figure International-7th
2003 IFBB Pittsburgh Pro Figure-6th
2003 IFBB Night Of Champions Figure-4th
2003 IFBB Ms. Figure Olympia–7th
2003 GNC Figure Show Of Strength–5th
2004 IFBB Arnold Figure International-4th
2004 IFBB GNC Show Of Strength Figure-2nd
2004 IFBB Pittsburgh Pro Figure 1st

See also
List of female fitness & figure competitors

References

External links
Official website
JMP Management Website
Franklin Website Page

1975 births
Fitness and figure competitors
Living people
People from Pickerington, Ohio
People from Glen Dale, West Virginia
Sportspeople from West Virginia
West Virginia University alumni
American sportswomen
21st-century American women